The 2002 FIA GT Estoril 500 km was the tenth and final round the 2002 FIA GT Championship season.  It took place at the Autódromo do Estoril, Portugal, on 20 October 2002.

Official results
Class winners in bold.  Cars failing to complete 70% of winner's distance marked as Not Classified (NC).

Statistics
 Pole position – #23 BMS Scuderia Italia – 1:37.073
 Fastest lap – #23 BMS Scuderia Italia – 1:40.099
 Average speed – 138.880 km/h

References

 
 
 

E
FIA GT Estoril 500km